Lincoln Earl Shropshire (February 17, 1900 – March 6, 1983) was an American politician in the state of Washington. He served in the Washington House of Representatives from 1953 to 1967 for district 14.

References

1983 deaths
1900 births
Republican Party members of the Washington House of Representatives
20th-century American politicians
People from South Bend, Washington